The Wafaa is an illegal political party in Algeria. It was banned in 2000

References

Banned political parties in Algeria
Political parties in Algeria